The slender silver-biddy (Gerres oblongus) is a species of mojarra native to marine and brackish waters of coastal waters of the Indian Ocean and the western Pacific Ocean, far towards Vanuatu. It inhabits estuaries, coastal waters and lagoons. This species is important to local commercial fisheries in many tropical countries.

References 

 Itis.org
 Animaldiversity Web
 WoRMS
 Research Gate

Slender silver-biddy
Fish described in 1830
Taxa named by Georges Cuvier